Siemomysł or Ziemomysł (died ) was the third duke of Polans of the Piast dynasty, and the father of Poland's first Christian ruler, Mieszko I.  He was listed by Gallus Anonymous in his Gesta principum Polonorum and was the son of Lestek, the second known Duke of the Polans. According to Gallus' account and historical research, Siemomysł has been credited with leaving the lands of the Polans, Goplans and Masovians to his son Mieszko I, who further expanded them during his reign.

According to modern Polish historian Henryk Łowmiański, Siemomysł aided the Ukrani uprising against the Germans in 954 AD.

He supposedly reigned from around 930 (although some historians believe that he reigned from around 950). Siemomysł united the lands of Polanie, Goplanie, and Mazowszanie (however, some historians think that perhaps his father did it first). His burial place is unknown.

Siemomysł's wife (or wives) is unknown. There is a theory that the daughter of Włodzisław, prince of the Lędzianie tribe, could have been Siemomysł's wife, but there is no historical evidence to support this. Formerly it was thought that his wife was named Gorka, but Oswald Balzer refuted this view in 1895. Mieszko I and Czcibor were his sons.

See also
Poland in the Early Middle Ages

References

10th-century Polish monarchs
Piast dynasty
Slavic pagans
10th-century deaths
Year of birth uncertain
Year of death uncertain